Pallars Jussà is a comarca (county) in Catalonia, Spain. It was established as a comarca in 1936, out of the old county of Pallars. The name means "Lower Pallars"; to the northeast and into the mountains is Pallars Sobirà. Its capital and largest municipality is Tremp.

Municipalities

See also
County of Pallars Jussà
Cabdella Lakes

References

External links

Official comarcal web site (in Catalan)
Information about Pallars Jussà from the Generalitat de Catalunya (in Catalan)

 
Comarques of the Province of Lleida